The term "trash culture" entered into common use in the West from the 1980s to indicate artistic or entertainment expressions considered to be of a low cultural profile but able to stimulate and attract the audiences. It refers to books, movies, TV shows, etc. characterized by poor taste, vulgar themes, and subjects chosen to attract the audience through shoddy, low-quality, and culturally impoverished content. In this sense, trash culture is defined as the validation of the voyeuristic sight of the middle class which approaches the popular culture as style of consumption.

The concept of trash culture should not be confused or merged with the concept of "kitsch", even if the two may be related. Kitsch is linked to art in a permanent way, but it is also a social phenomenon which establishes itself as a way of being: in Western society it is characterized by the limitation of the artist's space of creation. Kitsch is essentially multiplication and reachability. It is based on the consumeristic civilization which creates to produce, and produces to consume. It is a repetition whose consequence is a new activity in the relationship between man and environment: consumerism.

In this sense the concept of trash culture can be considered an evolution of the 19th-century concept of kitsch, a development of a consumeristic behavior that, at the beginning, was related to the lowest social classes. Now the phenomenon has embraced a wider range of classes, reaching the contemporary middle class and sometimes the high class. As kitsch was a social phenomenon that established itself as a way of being, so too trash culture can be defined, but in this one the aim of a continuous process of creation and consumption is the externalization and the accentuation of the self being, that can be expressed through the way of dressing, wearing accessories, and through the self social approach.

Trash literature 

The popular culture that surrounds the people in daily lives bears a striking similarity to some of the great works of literature of the past. In television, movies, magazines, and advertisements the people are exposed to many of the same stories as those critics who study the great books of literature, but they have simply been encouraged to look at those stories differently.

The great literature and cultural work of the past has been rewritten for today's consumer society, with supermarket tabloids such as the National Enquirer and celebrity gossip magazines like People serving as contemporary versions of the great dramatic tragedies of the past. Today's advertising repeats the tale of the Golden Age, but inverts the value system of a classic utopia; the shopping mall combines bits and pieces of the great garden styles of Western history, and now adds consumer goods; Playboy magazine revises Castiglione's Renaissance courtesy book, The Book of the Courtier; and Cosmopolitan magazine revises the women's coming-of-age novels of Jane Austen, Gustave Flaubert, and Edith Wharton.

Trash TV 

When speaking about trash TV, the term is referred to a whole branch of TV production that tends to exaggerate and to take themes to an extreme level. The objective of this kind of entertainment is to hit the audience through frenzy, accumulation and the absence of any distinction. Trash TV is very often close to ridiculousness, and exaggerating is the key resource: it exaggerates quantities and proportions, the physical and the body dimensions.

The term "trash TV" entered into everyday language in the 1980s, to indicate artistic expressions considered of low cultural profile, but able to stimulate an audience. Starting from the 80s, in fact, the private broadcasting channels started to be very spread, and this led to new marketing strategies, focused on the possibility of attracting a larger audience paying for more exclusive shows. Now, TV shows have to build up the brand of the TV station, creating content that cannot be found on the public channels or the competitors.

Further reading

References

Popular culture